The 1997 NCAA Division I men's soccer tournament was the 38th organized men's college soccer tournament by the National Collegiate Athletic Association, to determine the top college soccer team in the United States. The UCLA Bruins won their third national title by defeating the Virginia Cavaliers in the championship game, 2–0. The final match was played on December 14, 1997, in Richmond, Virginia, at Richmond Stadium for the third straight year. All other games were played at the home field of the higher seeded team.

National seeds

Bracket

References

NCAA Division I Mens Soccer
NCAA Division I Men's Soccer Tournament seasons
NCAA Division I Men's Soccer Tournament
NCAA Division I Men's Soccer Tournament